HD 75171, also known as HR  3495, is a solitary, white hued star located in the southern constellation of Volans. It has an apparent magnitude of 6.02, making it faintly visible to the naked eye under ideal conditions. Eggen (1995) lists it as a probable member of the Hyades Supercluster.

HD 75171 has a stellar classification of A4 V, indicating that it is an ordinary A-type main-sequence star. HD 75171 is estimated to be 630 million years old, well around the age of the actual Hyades cluster. Zorec and Royer (2012) model it to be a dwarf star 50.4% through its main sequence lifetime, and Gaia Data Release 3 models also show a star roughly halfway through its main sequence life. The star has a near solar metallicity, with the iron abundance being 87% that of the Sun.

References

A-type main-sequence stars
Volans (constellation)
Volantis, 41
PD-65 01013
075171
042895
3495
Hyades Stream